Fishbone and the Familyhood Nextperience Present: The Psychotic Friends Nuttwerx is an album by alternative rock band Fishbone, released in 2000. It features a large number of special guests and is the only Fishbone album released on Disney's Hollywood Records.

Whereas the band's previous album, the angry Chim Chim's Badass Revenge, contained some of the band's heaviest moments, Psychotic Friends Nuttwerx is full of sunny reggae, ska and pop hooks that make it the most accessible Fishbone album to date. The album has cameos from H.R. of Bad Brains, Gwen Stefani, George Clinton, Rose Stone, Rick James,  Flea, John Frusciante and Chad Smith of Red Hot Chili Peppers, Durga McBroom, best known for her work with Pink Floyd, and many others.

While AllMusic called it the band's best album in a decade, it received little support from the band's record label, and Fishbone once again found themselves without a record deal.

"Where'd You Get Those Pants?" uses the same melody as "Weed Plant," another Fishbone song.

Critical reception
LA Weekly called the album "a funk-o-ramic magnum opus." The Chicago Reader wrote that the "jittery, giggly, and thoroughly funky comeback attempt ranges from painstaking old-fashioned hand-constructed R & B to slinky reggae to a loving but violent mangling of Sly & the Family Stone's 'Everybody Is a Star.'"

Track listing

Personnel
Angelo Moore - vocals, saxophone, theremin; drums (#10)
Walter A. Kibby II - trumpet, vocals
Spacey T - guitars, vocals
John McKnight - piano, keyboards, trombone
John Norwood Fisher - bass guitar, vocals
John Steward - drums

Additional Personnel
Lenny Castro, percussion (#1-5,7-10)
Bronx Style Bob, vocals (#1,5)
H.R., vocals (#5)
Donny Osmond, backing vocals  (#1)
Ivan Neville, backing vocals (#1)
Alexandra Brown, backing vocals (#2-5,7)
Portia Griffin, backing vocals (#2-5,7)
Mona Lisa Young, backing vocals (#2-5,7)
Rose Stone, backing vocals (#4)
George Clinton, vocals (#4)
Gwen Stefani, vocals (#4)
Perry Farrell, backing vocals (#4,8)
Rick James, vocals (#4)
Durga McBroom, backing vocals (#10)
Kandice Lindsey, backing vocals (#10)
Monica Reed, backing vocals (#10)
John Frusciante, guitar (#1)
Jeff 'Skunk' Baxter, guitar (#1)
Tony Maiden, guitar (#3)
Ariel Sanzl, guitar (#5)
Daevid Baerwald, guitar ("Aids & Armageddon")
Billy Bass Nelson - bass guitar (#1), guitars (#9)
Flea - bass guitar (#1)
Chad Smith - drums (#1)
John Robinson, drums (#2-3,7)
Abe Laboriel Jr. - drums, loops (#4,5,8,9)
Dion Murdock, drums (#6,7)
Walt Fowler, horns (#1-5,7,9)
Bruce Fowler, horns (#1-5)
Albert Wing, horns (#1-5)
Lili Haydn, violin  (#4)
Charles Neville (#5)
Patrick Warren - chamberlin (#9)
Steve Lindsey, organ (#6,10), synth (#8-9)
Vicentico (#5)

References

2000 albums
Fishbone albums
Hollywood Records albums